TL;DR or tl;dr, short for "too long; didn't read", is internet slang to say that some text being referred to has been ignored because of its length. It is often used to refer to excessively wordy Terms and Conditions statements. It is also used to introduce a summary of an online post or news article.

The phrase dates back to at least 2002, and was added to the Oxford Dictionaries Online in 2013.

See also

 Abstract
 Attention economy
 BLUF – bottom line up front
 Information overload
 Internet culture
 Lexicographic information cost
 Long-form journalism

References

Acronyms
Internet memes
Internet slang